Tenaha Independent School District is a public school district based in Tenaha, Texas (USA).  It is located in north central Shelby County, the district extends into a small portion of Panola County.  In 2013, the school district was rated "academically acceptable" by the Texas Education Agency.

Tenaha ISD has three campuses -

Tenaha High School (Grades 9-12) 
Tenaha Middle School (Grades 6-8) 
Tenaha Elementary School (Grades PK-5)

References 

http://www.tenahaisd.com/site_view_announcement.aspx?id=a68d8dec-b3be-4683-a8b0-d0dbac23556a&messageId=37a2ba54-a7d2-48ff-8bcf-660a66cf1607&bx=NotSet&cm=FullPrimary

External links
Tenaha ISD

School districts in Shelby County, Texas
School districts in Panola County, Texas